Yyldyz Hotel is a luxury hotel located in Ashgabat, Turkmenistan. Built in 2013 by Bouygues, it has 155 rooms. It is a 24 story hotel, with a height of 107 meters.

Design and construction 
In the construction of high-rise hotel tower, about seven thousand tons of steel and more than 14,000 square meters of glass were used. The building has a teardrop shape. The total area is 50,620 square meters. The surrounding land has an area of roughly 85,000 square meters. The whole structure has a high degree of seismic resistance.

Features 
The hotel has 155 rooms, including presidential, deluxe and standard rooms.

On the 1st floor there is a large banquet hall with 1000 seats.

VIP apartments are located on the 14th floor.

On the 18th floor there is a panoramic restaurant with 600 seats.

See also
 List of tallest structures in Turkmenistan
 List of tallest structures in Central Asia

References

External links 
 Oficial website
 Yyldyz Hotel | BYME
 HOTEL YYLDYZ / Film Coporate

Hotel buildings completed in 2013
Hotels in Ashgabat
2013 establishments in Turkmenistan
Skyscrapers in Turkmenistan
Skyscraper hotels
Hotels established in 2013